The United States national futsal team represents the United States at international futsal competitions. It is governed by the United States Soccer Federation and affiliated with CONCACAF. The U.S. Futsal Federation was founded in 1981 and the first international futsal match played by the U.S. National Futsal Team was in May 1984 in Nanaimo, Canada where the United States won, 6–5. The first international futsal match in the United States was held in December, 1985, at Sonoma State University in Rohnert Park, California. The U.S. select team, defeated Australia, 9–5.

The U.S. golden age of futsal is the late 1980s and early 1990s when the team archived third-place at 1989 FIFA Futsal World Championship and runner-up at 1992 FIFA Futsal World Championship. After that, U.S. futsal has dropped down. They have also won CONCACAF Futsal Championships twice.

Results and fixtures

The following is a list of match results in the last 12 months, as well as any future matches that have been scheduled.
Legend

2021

Team

Current squad
The following is the squad that will participate in the 2021 FIFA Futsal World Cup in Lithuania from September 13 to October 3, 2021.

Competitive record

FIFA Futsal World Cup

CONCACAF Futsal Championship

*Draws include matches decided on penalty kicks

Grand Prix de Futsal
2005 – Did not enter
2006 – Did not enter
2007 – Did not enter
2008 – Did not enter
2009 – Did not enter
2010 – Did not enter
2011 – 16th place
2013 – Did not enter
2014 – Did not enter
2015 – Did not enter
2018 – TBD

Futsal Mundialito
1994 – Did not enter
1995 – 4th place
1996 – 4th place
1998 –  3rd place
2001 – Did not enter
2002 – Did not enter
2006 – Did not enter
2007 – Did not enter
2008 – Did not enter

Pan American Games
Rio de Janeiro 2007 – 5th place

All-time record
Until to 05/05/2016.

http://www.futsalplanet.com/matches/index.asp
http://theroonba.com/

Results

See also
United States Futsal Federation
Futsal in the United States
United States women's national futsal team

References

 
USA
National